BC Virtus, also known as Virtus Werkendam, is an amateur basketball club based in Werkendam, Netherlands. Virtus played in the Eredivisie as a professional club from 1996 till 2001. In those years, the club won one trophy: the NBB Cup in the 2000–01 season. The team also reached the Eredivisie Finals in the 1999–2000 season. In the 1985–86 season Virtus made an appearance in Europe, losing in the first round of the Korać Cup to Saski Baskonia.

Honours
NBB Cup 
Winners (1): 2000–01

Season by season

European record

Notes

References

Basketball teams in the Netherlands
Former Dutch Basketball League teams
Basketball teams established in 1971
Sports clubs in Altena, North Brabant